Vera Ignjatovic (born 1975) is a medical researcher specialising in paediatric thrombosis and haemostasis and in proteomics.

Early life and education 
Ignjatovic was born in Niš, Nišava, Serbia on 15 March 1975. She has a BSc (hons) and a PhD, for her thesis titled "The effects of a phytochemical preparation on lipid metabolism in obesity: the study of 'Slimax', a Chinese herbal mixture", from Monash University.

Academic career 
Ignjatovic was co-group leader of haematology research at the Murdoch Children's Research Institute and concurrently principal fellow, Department of Paediatrics at the University of Melbourne. Her research focus was on the effects of anticoagulants on children. She holds an honorary position in paediatrics at the Royal Children's Hospital in Melbourne.

 she moved to the United States to work at Johns Hopkins All Children's Institute for Clinical and Translational Research and was appointed professor of paediatrics at Johns Hopkins University.

Sporting career 
Ignjatovic was a member of the Australia women's national handball team at the 2000 Summer Olympics, playing in three group matches and in the final round. The Australian team were beaten by Angola into tenth place.

References

1975 births
Living people
Handball players at the 2000 Summer Olympics
Australian female handball players
Olympic handball players of Australia
Serbian emigrants to Australia
Australian haematologists
Monash University alumni
Academic staff of the University of Melbourne
Australian people of Serbian descent